The Baylor Bears women's basketball team represents Baylor University in Waco, Texas, in NCAA Division I women's basketball competition. They currently compete in the Big 12 Conference. The team plays its home games in Ferrell Center. Before the 2021–22 season, the team had been known as the "Lady Bears", but on September 3, 2021, the school officially announced that women's basketball had dropped "Lady" from its nickname. At the same time, soccer and volleyball, the other two Baylor women's teams that were still using "Lady" in their nicknames, also abandoned that usage.

The then-Lady Bears went undefeated at 40–0 to become the 2012 NCAA Division I National Champions in Women's College Basketball.

History

Olga Fallen years (1974-1979)
Olga joined the faculty of Baylor University in 1956 and served as an assistant professor of physical education through 1997.  She developed Baylor's women's athletic program from its beginning within the physical education department in 1959 and from 1972 to 1979, served as the coordinator of women's athletics. She was inducted into the Baylor Athletic Hall of Fame in 1999. Under her coaching the softball team, advanced to the AIAW regional tournament in 1978 and 1979. The Bearette basketball team posted a five-year record of 143–50 and earned two consecutive bids to the national AIAW tournament in 1976 and 1977, rated fifth and seventh in the nation those years.

Pam Bowers years (1979-1994)

Sonja Hogg years (1994-2000)

Source:

Kim Mulkey years (2000-2021)

In 2000, Kim Mulkey took over a Baylor program that had finished the 1999–2000 season 7–20 and last in the Big 12 Conference. In her first season at Baylor, she turned the Lady Bears program around, leading the team to its first NCAA tournament bid. The Lady Bears have now (as of 2019) put together 19 consecutive 20-win seasons and only once has the team lost more than 10 games in a season. The rise of the Baylor program under Mulkey was capped off in 2005 with a national title. This made her the fourth person to have won NCAA Division I basketball titles as a player and a head coach (after Joe B. Hall, Bob Knight and Dean Smith) and the first woman to do so.  The Lady Bears also captured the 2012 title with an undefeated season and the 2019 title. Mulkey departed the program for LSU in 2021.

Source:

Nicki Collen era (2021–present)

Nicki Collen, previously 2018 WNBA Coach of the Year WNBA's Atlanta Dream, replaced Mulkey as head coach after the latter's departure for LSU.

National Championships

Conference Championships

Conference honors and awards
Southwest Conference Player of the Year
Mary Lowry (1993–94)
Big 12 Coach of the Year
Kim Mulkey (2005, 2011, 2012, 2013, 2015, 2018, 2019)
Big 12 Player of the Year
Sophia Young (2005)
Brittney Griner (2011, 2012, 2013)
Odyssey Sims (2014)
Nina Davis (2015)
Kalani Brown (2018)
NaLyssa Smith (2021, 2022)
Big 12 Freshman of the Year
Brittney Griner (2010)
Odyssey Sims (2011)
Nina Davis (2014)
Big 12 Newcomer of the Year
Nicole Palmer (1997)
Sheila Lambert (2001)
Bernice Mosby (2007)
Destiny Williams (2011)
Alexis Jones (2016)
Te'a Cooper (2020)
DiJonai Carrington (2021)
Jordan Lewis (2022)
Big 12 Defensive Player of the Year
Abiola Wabara (2006)
Brittney Griner (2010, 2011, 2012, 2013)
Odyssey Sims (2014)
Lauren Cox (2018, 2019)
DiDi Richards (2020)
Big 12 Sixth Woman Award
Melissa Jones (2009)
Destiny Williams (2013)
Khadijiah Cave (2015)
Lauren Cox (2017)
Queen Egbo (2020)
DiJonai Carrington (2021)
Big 12 Tournament Most Outstanding Player
Sophia Young (2005)
Jessica Morrow (2009)
Brittney Griner (2011, 2012, 2013)
Nina Davis (2014, 2015)
Alexis Jones (2016)
Kalani Brown (2018, 2019)
NaLyssa Smith (2021)

National honors and awards

USBWA National Freshman of the Year
Brittney Griner – 2009–10
Odyssey Sims – 2010–11

Elite 90 Award
Lindsay Palmer – 2010, 2012

Wade Trophy
Brittney Griner – 2011–12, 2012–13
Odyssey Sims – 2013–14
 NaLyssa Smith – 2020–21

Naismith College Player of the Year
Brittney Griner – 2011–12, 2012–13

Frances Pomeroy Naismith Award 
Sheila Lambert – 2001–02 
Odyssey Sims – 2013–14

WBCA Defensive Player of the Year
Brittney Griner – 2010–11, 2011–12
DiDi Richards – 2019-20

NCAA basketball tournament Most Outstanding Player
Sophia Young – 2005
Brittney Griner – 2012
Chloe Jackson – 2019

Nancy Lieberman Award – Nation's top collegiate point guard
Odyssey Sims – 2013–14

Naismith Defensive Player of the Year Award
DiDi Richards – 2019-20

Facilities

Ferrell Center

The Ferrell Center is an arena in Waco, Texas. It was built in 1988 and is located adjacent to the Brazos River. When the Lady Bears play, the arena can hold 10,350.

All-time series records against current & former Big 12 members
As of Fall 2021

ALL-TIME BIG 12 WINS (REGULAR SEASON) AS OF 2018-2019

289 - Baylor (.753),

240 - Oklahoma (.625),

232 - Texas (.604),

221 - Iowa State (.576),

192 - Kansas State (.500),

182 - Texas Tech (.474),

152 - Oklahoma State (.396),

126 - Kansas (.328),

71 - West Virginia (.563),

50 - TCU (.397)

Year by year results

Conference tournament winners noted with # Source 

|-style="background: #ffffdd;"
| colspan=8 align="center" | Southwest Conference

|-style="background: #ffffdd;"
| colspan=8 align="center" | Big 12 Conference

Postseason results

NCAA Division I
The Bears have appeared in 19 tournaments, with a record of 53-17.

AIAW Division I
The Lady Bears made two appearances in the AIAW National Division I basketball tournament, with a combined record of 5–3.

References

External links